The 10th Engineer Regiment is a military engineer regiment of the Italian Army based in Cremona in Lombardy. Today the regiment is the engineer unit of the 132nd Armored Brigade "Ariete".

History 
On 13 October 1922, the 8th Army Corps Engineer Grouping was formed in Santa Maria Capua Vetere, which received the Sappers Battalion and the Telegraphers Battalion of the X Army Corps, and a miners company from the disbanded Miners Engineer Regiment. The grouping consisted of a command, a sappers-miners battalion, a telegraphers battalion, a photo-electricians company, two dovecotes (in Gaeta and Catanzaro), and a depot. On 5 November 1926, the grouping was renamed 10th Engineer Regiment. In February 1928, the regiment provided troops for the formation of the 11th Engineer Regiment. On 28 October 1932, the regiment received the IV Battalion of the disbanded 1st Radio-Telegraphers Regiment.

For the Second Italo-Ethiopian War the regiment mobilized on 23 September 1935 the X Replacements Engineer Battalion, which supplied 1,300 men to the 8th Engineer Regiment fighting in Ethiopia. The X Replacements Engineer Battalion was disbanded on 15 January 1936. The regiment also formed the XXXI, XXXII, XXXIII, and XXXIV sappers-engineer battalions in 1935 for the war, and the XXXIII and XXXVIII engineer battalions in 1936. The regiment also formed in 1936 the XX and XXXI marching engineer battalions for deployment to Ethiopia, which provided additional replacement troops to the already deployed battalions.

At the end of 1936, the regiment consisted of a command, an engineer battalion, a telegraphers battalion, the dovecote in Gaeta, and a depot. In January 1937, the telegraphers and radio-telegraphers battalions were renamed connections battalions. On 1 January 1937, the regiment's depot helped form the 20th Engineer Regiment, which was raised for service in Libya.

World War II 
With the outbreak of World War II the regiment's depot began to mobilize new units:

 Command of the 4th Engineer Grouping (for service in Albania)
 Command of the 130th Marching Regiment (to provide replacements for units fighting in the Western Desert Campaign)
 XXV Mixed Engineer Battalion (for the 25th Infantry Division "Bologna")
 XXVII Mixed Engineer Battalion (for the 27th Infantry Division "Brescia")
 LV Mixed Engineer Battalion (for the 55th Infantry Division "Savona")
 XIX Engineer Battalion
 XXIII Engineer Battalion
 XXIV Engineer Battalion
 IV Telegraphers Battalion
 X Army Corps Engineer Battalion
 X Army Corps Connections Battalion (for the X Army Corps)
 XL Workers Group
 and many smaller units

The regiment was disbanded by invading German forces after the announcement of the Armistice of Cassibile on 8 September 1943.

Cold War 
On 1 April 1953, III Army Corps Engineer Battalion was formed in Pavia by expanding the existing 3rd Territorial Engineer Company. On 1 June 1953, the Command Platoon and the 2nd Engineer Company were added. In November 1953 Field Park Company was activated. The battalion was assigned to the III Army Corps.

During the 1975 army reform, the army disbanded the regimental level and newly independent battalions were granted for the first time their own flags. During the reform engineer battalions were named for a lake if they supported a corps or named for a river if they supported a division or brigade. On 10 October 1975 the III Army Corps Engineer Battalion was renamed 3rd Engineer Battalion "Lario" and assigned the flag and traditions of the 10th Engineer Regiment. The battalion consisted of a command, a command and park company, and three engineer companies and was assigned to the 3rd Army Corps' Engineer Command.

On 1 January 1987, the Command and Park Company split into the Command and Services Company and the Special Equipment Company. In 1992, the battalion moved from Pavia to Cremona.

On 15 August 1993, the 3rd Engineer Battalion "Lario" was disbanded and the next day the 10th Pioneer Regiment was formed with the personnel and materiel of the disbanded battalion and the personnel and materiel of the 131st Engineer Battalion "Ticino", which had been disbanded on 10 June 1993. And on 16 August 1993 the flag and traditions of the 10th Engineer Regiment were transferred to the 10th Pioneer Regiment.

On 24 September 1996, the regiment was renamed 10th Engineer Regiment. In June 1999 the regiment relocated almost completely to Kosovo for Operation Joint Guardian. On 1 September 2000, the regiment was assigned to the 132nd Armored Brigade "Ariete".

International missions 
The regiment participated in the following international missions:

 Operation "Joint Forge" (Bosnia), in 1999 at company level and in 2000 at platoon level
 Operation “Joint Guarantor” (North Macedonia), in 1999 at company level
 Operation Joint Guardian (Kosovo), in 1999 and 2002 at regimental level and in 2000 and 2001 at battalion level
 ISAF (Afghanistan), in 2002, initially at company level and, later with two companies and a Multinational Engineer Group
 Enduring Freedom (Afghanistan), in 2003 with an EOD platoon
 Operation “Decisive Endeavor” (Kosovo), in 2003 at battalion level
 Operation Ancient Babylon (Iraq), in 2004 at regimental level

Current structure 

As of 2023 the 10th Engineer Regiment consists of:

  Regimental Command, in Cremona
 Command and Logistic Support Company
 Sappers Battalion "Ticino"
 1st Sappers Company
 4th Sappers Company
 5th Sappers Company
 6th Deployment Support Company

The Command and Logistic Support Company fields the following platoons: C3 Platoon, Transport and Materiel Platoon, Medical Platoon, Commissariat Platoon, and EOD Platoon. Each of the two sapper companies fields a Command Platoon, an Advanced Combat Reconnaissance Teams Platoon, and two sapper platoons. The Deployment Support Company and Mobility Support Company field the battalion's heavy military engineering vehicles: Biber bridgelayers, Dachs armored engineer vehicles, cranes, excavators, Medium Girder Bridges etc. The sapper companies and Command and Logistic Support Company are equipped with VTLM "Lince" and VTMM "Orso" vehicles.

See also 
 132nd Armored Brigade "Ariete"

External links
Italian Army Website: 10° Reggimento Genio Guastatori

References

Engineer Regiments of Italy
Military units and formations established in 1926
Military units and formations disestablished in 1943
Military units and formations established in 1975
Military units and formations disestablished in 1993
Military units and formations established in 1993